Matteo Ghidoni (c.1626 in Florence – 24 January 1689, in Padua) was an Italian painter of the Baroque period. Born in Florence, he was also known as Matteo dei Pitocchi, due to his dotty and flashy brushstrokes. He painted burlesque genre paintings, similar to those of Alessandro Magnasco. He died in Padua.

References

Ferdinand Šerbelj. Matteo Ghidoni (also Gidoni) Better known as Matteo de' Pitocchi, or Pitocchi (De') Matteo. Ljubljana, September 2009

1700 deaths
16th-century Italian painters
Italian male painters
Painters from Florence
Italian Baroque painters
Year of birth unknown
Year of birth uncertain